Rod Hunter (born 25 April 1956) is a former speedway rider from Australia.

Speedway career 
Hunter rode in the top two tiers of British Speedway from 1978 to 1990, riding for various clubs. Hunter was one of the leading National League riders and finished in the top ten averages in 1982, 1983 and 1990. He was also the Australian Longtrack Champion in 1978 and 1983.

References 

Living people
1956 births
Australian speedway riders
Belle Vue Aces riders
Coventry Bees riders
Eastbourne Eagles riders
Halifax Dukes riders
Hull Vikings riders
Middlesbrough Bears riders
Newcastle Diamonds riders